Volner or Völner is a Hungarian language occupational surname  for a wool worker (from German Wolle wool, cf. Wollner) and may refer to:
János Volner (1969), far-right Hungarian politician
Pál Völner (1962), Hungarian jurist and politician

References 

Hungarian-language surnames
Occupational surnames